The 25 mm APX modèle 1937 or Canon de 25 mm semi-automatique modèle 1937 was a French anti-tank gun that saw service in the first years of the Second World War.

Design
The mle 1937 was a lightened and lengthened version of the Hotchkiss designed Canon de 25 mm semi-automatique modèle 1934.  The mle 1937 was designed and produced by Puteaux and it weighed  vs  for the mle 1934.  The barrel of the mle 1937 was also  longer than the mle 1934.

The two guns were intended for different users and modes of transportation. The mle 1934 was intended to be used by motorized units and towed by motor vehicles while the mle 1937 was intended to be used by infantry units and towed by horses.

Users 
Finland - 50 French 25 mm M/37 antitank guns were purchased during the Winter War, but only 40 of them were delivered in February 1940 through Norway. The remaining ten guns were captured by the Germans when they invaded Norway in the spring of 1940. About half of the guns, which had arrived during the Winter War, saw front line service during it and three of them were lost in battle. During the Interim Peace the Germans sold 200 captured guns to Finland. 133 of them were model M/34s and 67 were model M/37s, and they were designated 25 PstK/34 and 25 PstK/37, respectively. They were withdrawn from front line use by 1943.
France - An unknown number were used by the French during the second world war.
Germany - The Germans used a number of captured guns under the designation 2.5 cm Panzerabwehrkanone 113(f) and these were used to arm Atlantic Wall fortifications in France and the occupied Channel Islands.
Spain - 150 mle 1937 guns were sold to Spain by the Germans during 1943.

Gallery

References

World War II weapons of France
World War II anti-tank guns
25 mm artillery
Military equipment introduced in the 1930s